Israel has competed in the European Games since they began in 2015. Their largest contingent of athletes ever sent to a sporting competition was the 2015 games, when 134 athletes were sent.

Medal Tables

Medals by Games

Medals by sports

List of medallists

Flag bearers

References